El diputado is a 1978 Spanish drama film co-written and directed  by Eloy de la Iglesia.

Nowadays, the film is a portrait of the society during the Spanish transition to democracy times.

Plot
Madrid, Roberto Orbea (José Sacristán) is a member of a Spanish left party. He is married to Carmen (María Luisa San José), and he has been elected as Deputy in the first democratic elections in Spain. But his enemies, the fascist, know his double life. Roberto likes boys, and they hire Juanito (José Luis Alonso) to seduce the politician. They fall in love.

Cast
 José Sacristán as Roberto Orbea
 María Luisa San José as Carmen Orbea
 José Luis Alonso as Juanito
 Enrique Vivó as Morena Pastrana
 Agustín González as Carres
 Queta Claver as Juanito's chef
 Ángel Pardo as Nes

References

External links
 

1978 films
1970s Spanish-language films
Spanish drama films
Spanish LGBT-related films
Political drama films
Male bisexuality in film
Films set in Madrid
Films about the Spanish Transition
Films directed by Eloy de la Iglesia
Films shot in Madrid
Teensploitation
1970s Spanish films